Wolfgang Georg Sievers, AO (18 September 1913 – 7 August 2007) was an Australian photographer who specialised in architectural and industrial photography.

Early life and career

Sievers was born in Berlin, Germany. His father was Professor Johannes Sievers, an art and architectural historian with the German Foreign Office until his dismissal by the government in 1933, and author of the first four volumes of a monograph on the neo-classical architect Karl Schinkel. His mother was Herma Schiffer, a writer and educator of Jewish background who was Director of the Institute for Educational Films.

From 1936 to 1938, he studied at the Contempora Lehrateliers für neue Werkkunst in Berlin, a progressive private art school created by architect Fritz August Breuhaus de Groot, which, like the famous Bauhaus, strongly emphasized the unity of all applied arts. Sievers took architectural photographs for his father's books on Berlin's historical buildings, particularly the work of Karl Schinkel. He also spent a year working in Portugal from 1935 to 1936. In 1938, he was retained as a teacher at the Contempora, but decided to emigrate to Australia following rumours of the school's imminent closure by the authorities. He had arranged for his photographic equipment to be transported, but was briefly questioned by the Gestapo, then conscripted as an aerial photographer for the Luftwaffe. He fled the country immediately, going first to England in June.

In Australia, Sievers opened a studio in South Yarra, Melbourne. After war was declared, he volunteered for the Australian Army and served from 1942 to 1946. Following demobilisation, he established a studio at Grosvenor Chambers in fashionable Collins Street, initially drawing many of his commissions from fellow European immigrants including the architect Frederick Romberg, and Ernst Fuchs who had arrived from Vienna. During his early years in Melbourne, Sievers became a lifelong friend of fellow émigré photographer Helmut Newton and his Australian actress wife June Browne, who later made photographs herself under the pseudonym "Alice Springs".

Work

Significant corporate clients included Alcoa, Australian Paper Manufacturers, Comalco, Hamersley Iron, John Holland Group, John Lysaght, Shell and Vickers Ruwolt. He also received commissions from architectural firms including Bates, Smart and McCutcheon, Hassall & McConnell, Leith & Bartlett, Winston Hall and Yuncken Freeman. In the 1950s, Sievers was engaged by the then Department of Overseas Trade with a brief to change Australia's image from a land of sheep and wool to an image of a sophisticated industrial and manufacturing nation. Many of these images were published in the magazine Walkabout.

Sievers' work after the war was imbued with the Bauhaus ethos and philosophy of the New Objectivity he had learned in Berlin, combined with a socialist belief in the inherent dignity of labour. His photographs were often overtly theatrical, as he commonly photographed industrial machinery at night, isolating details with artificial light and posing workers for heightened effect. This can be seen in 'Gears for Mining Industry' (1967), perhaps his most well known single image. Despite the contrived nature of many of these images, this approach was extraordinarily influential in Australian post-war commercial photography.

In 1989, the Australian National Gallery staged a retrospective of his work, an exhibition which travelled around the country, often accompanied by Sievers' lectures. In 2000, he was the subject of a major retrospective exhibition held in Lisbon, Portugal at the "Arquivo Fotografico Municipal de Lisboa". For his services to photography, he was appointed an Officer of the Order of Australia (AO) in 2002.

The National Library of Australia has an archive of more than 50,000 of Sievers' negatives and transparencies.

Sievers was active in Australia, Germany and Austria with research into the emigration of war criminals to Australia from 1990 to 1998. In 2007, he donated several hundred photographs from his archive, worth up to A$1 million, to raise money for justice and civil liberties causes.

Wolfgang Sievers died at the age of 93, a month short of his 94th birthday.

References

Further reading

 The Life and Work of Wolfgang Sievers, Australian National Gallery exhibition catalogue, 1989
 Helen Ennis, 'Blue hydrangeas: Four émigré photographers' in The Europeans: Émigré Artists in Australia 1930-1960, Roger Butler (ed.), National Gallery of Australia, 1997
 Helen Ennis, Wolfgang Sievers, Canberra: National Library of Australia, 2011.

External links
 The Sievers Project, article about the exhibition in Centre for Contemporary Photography The Eye of Photography
 Foreign Influences in Australian Photography 1930-80 by Robert Deane
 Photographic archive 1938-1991 held at the National Library of Australia in Canberra
 Celebrated photographer Sievers dies
Melbourne post-war photography State Library of Victoria, Australia
 

1913 births
2007 deaths
Architectural photographers
Australian Jews
20th-century Australian photographers
Australian military personnel of World War II
Australian photographers
Jewish emigrants from Nazi Germany to Australia
Photographers from Berlin
Commercial photographers
Officers of the Order of Australia
Photographers from Melbourne